This is a list of stories of the British science fiction series, The Tomorrow People. It was originally broadcast from 1973 to 1979, with a revival series airing from 1992 to 1995.

ITV broadcast the original series of The Tomorrow People in the 1970s. Nickelodeon broadcast the original 1970s version in the United States in the early 1980s, and broadcast all five stories from the 1990s series in the United States and Australia. The Seven Network in Australia broadcast the original series, as did Television New Zealand. Both shows were also seen in other parts of the World.

1970s series

Series 1 (1973)
Regular Cast: Nicholas Young (John), Peter Vaughan-Clarke (Stephen), Sammie Winmill (Carol), Stephen Salmon (Kenny), Philip Gilbert (Voice of TIM), Michael Standing (Ginge)
Producer: Ruth Boswell

Series 2 (1974)
Regular Cast: Nicholas Young (John), Peter Vaughan-Clarke (Stephen), Elizabeth Adare (Elizabeth), Chris Chittell (Chris), Philip Gilbert (Voice of TIM)
Producer: Ruth Boswell

Series 3 (1975)
Regular Cast: Nicholas Young (John), Peter Vaughan-Clarke (Stephen), Elizabeth Adare (Elizabeth), Dean Lawrence (Tyso), Philip Gilbert (Voice of TIM)
Producer: Ruth Boswell

Series 4 (1975-76)
Regular Cast: Nicholas Young (John), Peter Vaughan-Clarke (Stephen), Elizabeth Adare (Elizabeth), Dean Lawrence (Tyso), Philip Gilbert (Voice of TIM), Mike Holoway (Mike Bell)
Producer: Roger Price

Series 5 (1977)
Regular Cast: Nicholas Young (John), Elizabeth Adare (Elizabeth), Mike Holoway (Mike Bell), Philip Gilbert (Voice of TIM)
 Producer: Vic Hughes

Series 6 (1978)
Regular Cast: Nicholas Young (John), Mike Holoway (Mike), Misako Koba (Hsui Tai), Philip Gilbert (Voice of TIM)
 Producer: Vic Hughes

Series 7 (1978)
Regular Cast: Nicholas Young (John), Elizabeth Adare (Elizabeth), Mike Holoway (Mike), Misako Koba (Hsui Tai), Nigel Rhodes (Andrew Forbes), Philip Gilbert (Voice of TIM)
 Producer: Vic Hughes

Series 8 (1979)
Regular Cast: Nicholas Young (John), Elizabeth Adare (Elizabeth), Mike Holoway (Mike), Misako Koba (Hsui Tai), Nigel Rhodes (Andrew Forbes), Philip Gilbert (Voice of TIM)
 Producer: Vic Hughes

1990s series 
Tomorrow People: Kristian Schmid (Adam Newman), Christian Tessier (Megabyte (Marmaduke Damon)), Adam Pearce (Kevin Wilson) (only until The Culex Experiment), Kristen Ariza (Lisa Davies) (only in The Origin Story), Naomie Harris (Ami Jackson) (from The Culex Experiment), Alexandra Milman (Jade Weston) (The Living Stones with a brief appearance in The Culex Experiment)
Producer: Roger Damon Price (Series 1), Alan Horrox (Series 2 and 3)

Series 1 (1992)
Note: A short test pilot version of the first episode entitled A Bad Dream Gets Real was created before full production began. Its content was roughly that of the first two episodes of The Origin Story. This remains unaired, as it was an internal proof of concept only. The main cast was made up of the same actors, except that Stephen Pollard played Kevin.

Series 2 (1994)

Series 3 (1995)

Audio series 
From 2001 to 2007, five series of audio adventures starring several of the original 1970s cast were released by Big Finish Productions. A planned sixth series was cancelled.

Series 1 
The New Gods by Rebecca Levene and Gareth RobertsApril 2001, 2 episodes
The Deadliest Species by Gary RussellSeptember 2001, 3 episodes
The Ghosts of Mendez by Austen AtkinsonJanuary 2002, 3 episodes
The Sign of Diolyx by Mike Tucker and Robert Perry (two discs)May 2002, 3 episodes

Series 2 
A New Atlantis by Nigel FairsApril 2003, 3 episodes
The Power of Fear by Steve LyonsJune 2003, 3 episodes
The Curse of Kaavan by Nigel FairsAugust 2003, 3 episodes
Alone by Nigel Fairs June 2004, 3 episodes

Series 3 

The Slarvian Menace by Mark WrightOctober 2004, 3 episodes
The Warlock's Dance by Cavan ScottOctober 2004, 3 episodes
A Living Hell by Nigel FairsFebruary 2005, 3 episodes
Trigonometry by Gary RussellMarch 2005, 3 episodes

Series 4 

Saying Goodbye by Nigel Fairs August 2005, 3 episodes
The Lords of Forever by Craig HintonOctober 2005, 3 episodes
Queen of Slarvos by Nigel FairsJanuary 2006, 3 episodes
A Plague of Dreams by Jim Mortimore (two discs)April 2006, 6 episodes

Series 5 

A Broken Song by Nigel FairsJune 2006, 3 episodes
Aftermath by Joseph LidsterAugust 2006, 1 episode
Spiritus Mundi by Craig HintonOctober 2006, 3 episodes
Stemming the Tide by Helen Goldwyn December 2006, 3 episodes
End of Silence by Alex CroweFebruary 2007, 3 episodes
Rachel by Nigel Fairs April 2007, 2 episodes

Proposed titles for Series 6 

Series six was cancelled part way through the production of Saving the World, Talking to God and Tandem. These episodes will not be released through official channels. Originally scheduled for release from August 2007 to January 2008.
Saving the World by Nigel Fairs
Talking to God by Nigel Fairs
War of the Slarvians by Cavan Scott and Mark Wright
Tandem by Helen Goldwyn
Godwin's Law by Joseph Lidster
Buartek by Nigel Fairs

Proposed titles for Series 7 

A planned seventh series would have seen Cavan Scott and Mark Wright replace Nigel Fairs as series producers, with the stories taking place a few years after the events of Series 6 in order to act as a reboot.

The Next Stage by Cavan Scott and Mark Wright
Kalki Reborn by Nigel Fairs
The Modern Children by Paul Magrs
The Screaming Planet by Iain McLaughlin and Claire Bartlett
TIM by Joseph Lidster
The Scream of Sogguth by Cavan Scott and Mark Wright

DVD releases 
The original series was released on DVD in both region 1 and 2. All eight series of the original 1970s series were released on DVD through Revelation Films in the UK. All discs are Region 0 and are playable in most countries where PAL is the standard. In 2005, A&E TV Home Entertainment (under license from THAMES, talkbackTHAMES and FremantleMedia International) released three boxsets for North America, in the NTSC format, that contain all eight seasons and the documentary "Beyond Tomorrow".

The 1990s series was released as a 5-DVD set but only in region 2 in September 2005.

References

External links 
 The Tomorrow People (1970s series) at IMDb.com
 The Tomorrow People (1990s series) at IMDb.com
 The Tomorrow People, episode guide

Tomorrow People, The
Tomorrow People
Serials